The following is a list of Stax products, items manufactured by Stax Ltd.

Headphones

Currently in production

Discontinued

Headphone amplifiers

Currently in production

Stax currently produces six solid-state and three hybrid vacuum-tube/solid-state hybrid earspeaker driver units.

Discontinued

Amplifier adapters

Stax currently does not produce any amplifier adapters.

Systems (headphone + driver)

Electrostatic loudspeakers (discontinued)
ELS-4A - Electrostatic loudspeakers, 1976
ELS-6A - Electrostatic loudspeakers, 1976
ELS-F81 - Electrostatic loudspeaker, 1981
ESTA-4U - Electrostatic loudspeaker, 1982 (self-biasing)
EK-1 - Kit electrostatic speaker, 1983
ELS-F83 - Electrostatic loudspeaker, 1983
ESTA-4U Extra - Electrostatic loudspeaker, 1983 (self-biasing)
EK-1/MK2 - Electrostatic loudspeaker, 1984
ELS-F81 NEW - Electrostatic loudspeaker, 1984
ELS-8X BB - Electrostatic loudspeaker, 1987 (battery-biased)
ELS-6X - Electrostatic loudspeaker, 1988
ELS-8X - Electrostatic loudspeaker, 1988
ELS-F81X - Electrostatic loudspeaker, 1988
CLASS Model2 - Electrostatic loudspeaker, 1992

Tonearms
UA-3 - Tonearm
UA-3N - Tonearm
UA-3NL -Tonearm
UA-7 -  Tonearm
UA-70 - Tonearm
UA-7N - Tonearm
UA-70N - Tonearm
UA-7cf - Tonearm
UA-9N - Tonearm
UA-90N - Tonearm
UA-9 - Tonearm
UA-90 - Tonearm

Other audio products
CPY - Electrostatic phono cartridge
CPY-MK2 - Electrostatic phono cartridge
ECP-1 - Equalizer/adapter for Stax electrostatic photo cartridges
ED-1 Monitor - Equalizer for SR-Lambda/Professional, 1988
ED-1 Signature - Diffuse field equalizer for SR-Lambda Signature, 1990
DAC-X1T - Digital-to-analogue converter, 1989
DAC-TALENT - Digital-to-analogue converter, 1990
DA-300 - Speaker amplifier
DA-80 - Speaker amplifier
CDP Quattro - CD player, 1986
CDP Quattro 2 - CD player, 1988

Accessories
SRE-15/44 (5 meter) earspeaker extension cord (discontinued)
SRE-750 or SRE-950S (5 meter) and SRE-725 or SRE-925S (2.5 meter), earspeaker extension cords
HPS-2, wooden earspeaker stand
HPS-1, wooden and plastic earspeaker stand (discontinued)
CPC-1, protective cover

References 

"Product History". Stax.

Stax products
Headphones
Electronics lists